Eileen Clarke is a Canadian provincial politician, who was elected as the Member of the Legislative Assembly of Manitoba for the riding of Agassiz in the 2016 election. She is a member of the Manitoba Progressive Conservative Party.

On 3 May 2016, Clarke was appointed to the Executive Council of Manitoba as Minister of Indigenous and Municipal Relations. On July 9, 2021, Clarke resigned from Cabinet following controversial comments made by the Premier of Manitoba, Brian Pallister, about the history of colonization in Canada.

References 

Living people
21st-century Canadian politicians
Progressive Conservative Party of Manitoba MLAs
Women MLAs in Manitoba
Members of the Executive Council of Manitoba
21st-century Canadian women politicians
Women government ministers of Canada
Year of birth missing (living people)